Gene Marks is a columnist, author, and small business owner. A past columnist for both The Washington Post and The New York Times, Marks writes regularly for  The Hill, The Philadelphia Inquirer, Forbes, Inc. magazine, Entrepreneur.com, The Washington Times and The Guardian.

Career
Marks has written six best-selling books on business management, specifically geared towards small- and medium-sized companies. Nationally, he frequently appears on MSNBC and Fox Business as well as The John Batchelor Show and SiriusXM's Wharton Business Daily where he talks about the financial, economic and technology issues that affect business leaders today.

Through his keynotes and breakout sessions, Marks helps business owners, executives and managers understand the political, economic and technological trends that will affect their companies and—most importantly—the actions they can take to continue to grow and profit.

Marks owns and operates The Marks Group PC, a firm that provides technology and consulting services to small and medium sized businesses.

Prior to starting the Marks Group PC Gene, a Certified Public Accountant, spent nine years in the entrepreneurial services arm of the international consulting firm KPMG in Philadelphia where he was a Senior Manager.

Marks wrote an opinion piece discussing the trend of 'quiet quitting' and described those who engage in the practice as "not taking your job seriously" and called those who decided to just meet their obligations at their jobs, "mediocre employees" and put some of the blame of the "economic slowdown" on those who decided they didn't want to go "above and beyond"  for their employees when they saw no reward for their effort.

References

Giliberti, Christina "My Interview With Gene Marks On Blogging, Books And Controversy" Tweak Your Biz.com, February 24, 2012
Toner, Amy "Get Ready for the Affordable Care Act" The NATSO Show 2014, December 1, 2013
CT Corporation Staff "Interview with Gene Marks: What Small Business Owners Should Know for 2019" Wolters Kluwer, January 21, 2019
Greenberg, Gregg "Growth Tips from Small Business Expert Gene Marks" Good Company's Growth Studio, February 25, 2019
"“I Like to Feel That Every Day I’ve Actually Accomplished Something”" Staples Business Hub, February 25, 2020

External links 
 
 The Marks Group PC official website
Zoho Training: Marks Group Live

Year of birth missing (living people)
Living people
HuffPost writers and columnists
The New York Times columnists